Jennifer Zilm is a Canadian poet. Her first book, Waiting Room (2016), was a finalist for the Robert Kroetsch Award for Innovative Poetry, and has been described as making a "valuable contribution to the documentary tradition in Canadian poetry." Her second book, The Missing Field (2018), was a finalist for the Pat Lowther Award. The Malahat Review praised its poems "centred on the intellectual landscapes of documents and ephemera" for being "endlessly intricate and beautiful".

Zilm is a former member of the Room Magazine editorial collective. She is a librarian and archivist and her work draws heavily on techniques such as collage and erasure.

Bibliography 

 Waiting Room (2016) BookThug
 The Missing Field (2018) Guernica Editions

References 

21st-century Canadian women writers
21st-century Canadian poets
Year of birth missing (living people)
Living people
Canadian women poets